The Game with Women is a 1922 German silent drama film directed by Adolf E. Licho and starring Hanni Weisse, Georg Alexander, and Lotte Neumann.

The film's sets were designed by the art director Robert Neppach.

Cast

References

Bibliography

External links

1922 films
Films of the Weimar Republic
Films directed by Adolf E. Licho
German silent feature films
German black-and-white films
UFA GmbH films
1922 drama films
German drama films
Silent drama films
1920s German films
1920s German-language films